There are over 20,000 Grade II* listed buildings in England. This page is a list of these buildings in the district of Colchester in Essex.

List of buildings

|}

See also 
 Grade I listed buildings in Essex
 Grade II* listed buildings in Essex
 Grade II* listed buildings in Basildon (district)
 Grade II* listed buildings in Braintree (district)
 Grade II* listed buildings in Brentwood (borough)
 Grade II* listed buildings in Castle Point
 Grade II* listed buildings in Chelmsford (borough)
 Grade II* listed buildings in Epping Forest (district)
 Grade II* listed buildings in Harlow
 Grade II* listed buildings in Maldon (district)
 Grade II* listed buildings in Rochford (district)
 Grade II* listed buildings in Southend-on-Sea
 Grade II* listed buildings in Tendring
 Grade II* listed buildings in Thurrock
 Grade II* listed buildings in Uttlesford
 Churches in Colchester

Notes

External links

Borough of Colchester
Lists of Grade II* listed buildings in Essex